Joinvillea is a flowering plants genus in the family Joinvilleaceae. The family consists of one genus with species distributed from the Malay Peninsula to the Caroline Islands and high islands in the Pacific Ocean.  It is evolutionarily significant as a relictual group that is a close relative of grasses.  They closely resemble large grass plants, in both general appearance and microanatomy, but possess fleshy fruits.

Species
 Joinvillea ascendens Gaudich. ex Brongn. & Gris Hawaiian Islands
 Joinvillea borneensis Becc. Western Malesia to Caroline Islands
 Joinvillea bryanii Christoph. Samoa
 Joinvillea plicata (Hook.f.) Newell & B.C.Stone Solomon Islands to New Caledonia and southwest Pacific

References

External links

Poales
Taxa named by Adolphe-Théodore Brongniart
Taxa named by Jean Antoine Arthur Gris
Taxa named by Charles Gaudichaud-Beaupré